Sangre de mi tierra is an American telenovela that premiered on Telemundo on 29 November 2017, and concluded on 20 February 2018. The telenovela is an original story by Valentina Párraga, and produced by José Gerardo Guillén for Telemundo.

It stars Ana Belena and Lambda García as main characters, along to Santiago Ramundo as main villain, with Miguel de Miguel, Antonio de la Vega, Carolina Gómez, Gloria Peralta, and the special appearance of Daniel Elbittar.

Plot 

Crisanto Castañeda (Antonio de la Vega) and Natalia Martínez de Montiel (Carolina Gómez) are people from the land and the vineyards. For them, the grape, its cultivation, the elaboration of the musts and the quality of its wines is not a trade or a way of sustaining itself. It is a passion. A way of life. The only way to breathe and feel. This is the story that we are going to tell. Two intense and complicated families, Los Castañeda and Los Montiel, their encounters, their enmity, their loves, their hatreds and their intolerances, within the framework of the great passion they share: life.

Crisanto Castañeda came to Napa thirty years ago, from his native Michoacán, without a dime. After many years of hard work, he has conquered his world: he has a faithful wife, Mercedes (Gloria Peralta), four children: Emilio (Daniel Elbittar), Aurora (Ana Belena), Paloma (Josette Vidal) and Leonardo (Héctor Medina); It has its splendid vineyards, but above all, it owns its bodega of strong and powerful wines, just like him.

Natalia Martínez de Montiel (Carolina Gómez) was born in the great vineyards of Napa, and grew picking grapes next to her parents, Joaquín (Rubén Morales) and Emilia Martínez, humble braceros who fought to give her a better future in this new land and, thanks to them, she was able to achieve a career university. She married Paco Montiel (Miguel de Miguel), an educated and good man, who supported her in her dreams of becoming a winemaker and today is still planted with expansion plans. He had only one son, Luis Montiel (Gabriel Rossi), married to Anita Carmona (Estefany Oliveira), and a winemaker, like his father. In addition, she had to raise the eldest son of her husband, the problematic Juan José Montiel (Lambda García).

Los Castañeda and Los Montiel have a friendship of years. Joaquín Martínez (Rubén Morales) helped Crisanto (Antonio de la Vega) buy his first land, and Crisanto, many years later, lent the money to Los Montiel to open their small cellar. The harmony of the relationship ends with the death of Emilio (Daniel Elbittar), the eldest son of Crisanto, in a car accident caused by the imprudence of his best friend, Juanjo Montiel (Lambda García), the son of Paco (Miguel de Miguel). From that family tragedy, a war between families and wineries is established. Because Crisanto, taken by the pain and the rage for his loss, puts a demand that aggravates the sentence of unintentional homicide of Juan José, Juanjo lasts a year and a half to jail, and terminates his relationship with Aurora (Ana Belena) the daughter of Crisanto. But in the midst of hatred, love underlies: Juanjo's love for Aurora, who is now married with Roberto (Santiago Ramundo). There is also a passionate love between Paco, Natalia's husband, for Paloma (Josette Vidal), the youngest daughter of the Castañeda. This relationship ends up aggravating the continuous fights and traps that are inflicted Natalia and Crisanto. And at the height of this enmity, there is a murder, which will put the two families in check, since many had reasons to commit it. Added to the suspense created by the murder, each of the members in both families will have to fight against their own and particular demons until they are defeated.

Cast

Main 
 Ana Belena as Aurora Castañeda
 Lambda García as Juan José "Juanjo" Montiel
 Santiago Ramundo as Roberto Quiroga
 Antonio de la Vega as Crisanto Castañeda
 Carolina Gómez as Natalia Martínez de Montiel
 Miguel de Miguel as Paco Montiel
 Gloria Peralta as Mercedes Paredes de Castañeda
 Daniel Elbittar as Emilio Castañeda

Also main 
 Laura Chimaras as Serena Zambrano
 Josette Vidal as Paloma Castañeda
 Gabriel Rossi as Luis Montiel
 Dad Dáger as Susan Acosta
 Rubén Morales as Joaquín
 Alba Roversi as Sara
 Francisco Porras as Dimas
 Roberto Plantier as Ernesto Merchan
 Maky Soler as Doris Anderson
 Estefany Oliveira as Ana Barrios de Montiel
 Keller Wortham as Horacio
 Héctor Medina as Leornado
 Gabriel López as Rafael Zambrano
 Federico Díaz as Mike
 Ana Sobero as Dolores Pérez
 Liz Dieppa as Sofía

Special participation 
 Johanna Cure as Kimberly Figueroa
 Carlos Santos as Iván
 Aneudy Lara as Jordan Giménez
 Fernando Pacanins as Dr. Portillo
 César Rodríguez as Wilmer
Raw Leiba as Dario Guapos

Recurring 
 Tangi Colombel as Smith
 Ezequiel Montalt as Daniel Fajardo

Production 
The telenovela is an original by Valentina Párraga, written by María Helena Portas and Marco Tulio Socorro and directed by Tony Rodríguez, Ricardo Schwarz, and Otto Rodríguez, and produced by José Gerardo Guillén.

Promotion 
The first complete advance of the telenovela was launched on Telemundo on November 14, 2017, during the broadcast of the second season of Sin senos sí hay paraíso.

Reception 
During the premiere of the telenovela, this had good reception from the audience. According to People en Español, the quality of the image and direction were pleasing to attract the public.

Ratings 
 
}}

Notes

Episodes

References

External links 
 

Telemundo telenovelas
Spanish-language American telenovelas
American telenovelas
2010s American LGBT-related drama television series
2017 telenovelas
2017 American television series debuts
2018 American television series endings